Elachista seductilis is a moth of the family Elachistidae that is endemic to New South Wales.

The forewings are pale bluish grey. Females are darker. The hindwings are dark grey.

The larvae feed on Carex appressa and Cyperus exaltatus. They mine the leaves of their host plant. The larvae usually mine downwards, but can change direction when meeting obstacles. The mine is straight, gradually widening and greenish white in colour. The frass is deposited in a long regular row along the center of the mine. Pupation takes place outside of the mine on the midrib of a leaf of the host plant under the shelter of a dense web.

References

Moths described in 2011
seductilis
Moths of Australia
Taxa named by Lauri Kaila